Carlos Alberto Massara (born 19 June 1978) is a football player.

Massara moved to Greece to play for Akratitos F.C. in the Alpha Ethniki in August 1999.

References

1978 births
Living people
Argentine footballers
Association football defenders
A.P.O. Akratitos Ano Liosia players
Panelefsiniakos F.C. players
Marko F.C. players
Levadiakos F.C. players
Asteras Tripolis F.C. players
Atromitos F.C. players
Diagoras F.C. players
Super League Greece players
Primera C Metropolitana players
Argentine expatriate footballers
Argentine expatriate sportspeople in Greece
Expatriate footballers in Greece